= Stock clearance =

Stock clearance is an activity by a company where ownership of products and materials moves on to another legal entity. These products and materials in stock clearance will not form the basis of a company's key activities. As such, they are often end-of-line, surplus, returned, or bankrupt.

A company will often pursue a non-profit-making agenda when clearing stock, seeking a wider strategic advantage. This can be in the form of releasing storage space, releasing supervision of materials and equipment, ending technical support for a product. Many companies avoid channel conflict by selling anonymously through specialised stock clearance companies. In doing so they seek the preservation of the existing corporate image.

Most companies from time to time end up with surplus goods, liquidated goods and bankrupt stock. This can be a costly problem.

When customers are told that the reason for a price reduction is a stock clearance, they find this less attractive than other explanations such as a volume discount. This is because they suspect that the stock clearance indicates that the products are of poor quality.

There are a number of companies that specialise in stock clearance. Clients can dispose of their surplus stock discreetly through companies such as stock buyers who will then re-sell this stock to exporters, wholesalers, and smaller retailers. There are many benefits of using a stock clearance company to dispose of stock in this way. They generally have the cash and warehousing available to offer a quick and efficient solution to stock disposal problems.

Stock clearance, also known as inventory clearance, refers to the sale of remaining merchandise or goods at significantly reduced prices to clear out old or overstocked inventory, making room for new products. Companies often engage in stock clearance sales to optimise inventory levels, minimise holding costs, and free up space in warehouses or retail outlets.
